Ebba Hilda Maria Östenson (27 May 1894, Tampere – 23 August 1988, Helsinki) was a Finnish politician who served as a member of the Parliament of Finland for the Uusimaa constituency from 1933 to 1936 and again from 1939 to 1954, representing the Swedish People's Party of Finland (SFP).

References 

1894 births
1988 deaths
Politicians from Tampere
Swedish-speaking Finns
Swedish People's Party of Finland politicians
Members of the Parliament of Finland (1933–36)
Members of the Parliament of Finland (1939–45)
Members of the Parliament of Finland (1945–48)
Members of the Parliament of Finland (1948–51)
Members of the Parliament of Finland (1951–54)
20th-century Finnish women politicians
Women members of the Parliament of Finland